Qingdao (113) is a Type 052 destroyer of the People's Liberation Army Navy. She was commissioned in May 1997.

Development and design 

Qingdao is the second and last ship of the Luhu class following her sister ship, Harbin (112).

Construction and career 
Qingdao was constructed by Jiangnan Shipyard and launched in 1993. She underwent a refit and upgrade in 2011.

On 27 February 2012, Qingdao, along with the Type 054A frigate Yantai and the comprehensive supply ship Weishanhu, formed the 11th Chinese naval escort flotilla which departed from the city of Qingdao to conduct anti-piracy and escort missions in the Gulf of Aden and Somali waters.

On 9 June 2013, Qingdao made a goodwill visit to Pearl Harbor, Hawaii.

In October 2013, Qingdao participated in the International Fleet Review 2013 in Sydney, Australia.

Gallery

References 

1994 ships
Ships built in China
Type 052 destroyers